Like It or Not may refer to:

 "Like It or Not" (song), a song by Genesis from the album Abacab
 "Like It or Not", a song by Madonna from the album Confessions on a Dance Floor
 "Like It or Not", a song by Status Quo from the album Thirsty Work
 Like It or Not (album), a compilation album by American alternative rock band Caroline's Spine
 Like It or Not (EP), an EP by Architecture in Helsinki
 "...like it or not", a 2008 notable speech by Mayor Gavin Newsom which unintentionally contributed to the passage of California Proposition 8